Rynhardt Elstadt (born 20 December 1989) is a South African rugby union player for the South Africa national team and French Top 14 side . He plays flank forward and lock.

Career
On 19 March 2011 he helped the Stormers defeat the Blue Bulls at Loftus Versfeld stadium in Pretoria, by outplaying legendary hardman Bakkies Botha.  In October 2014 he was part of the Western Province team who won the Currie Cup by beating the Lions 19-16. In June 2019 Elstadt started for Stade Toulousain in the Top 14 final, winning the French Championship. He won his first cap for South Africa in 2019 and played a part in Springboks winning the 2019 Rugby Championship.

Honours

Western Province
 2014 Currie Cup winner

Toulouse
Heineken Cup European Champions/European Rugby Champions Cup: 2021
Top 14 French League : 2019, 2021

South Africa 
 2019 Rugby Championship winner

Test history

Super Rugby statistics

See also
List of South Africa national rugby union players – Springbok no. 912

References

External links
 

1989 births
Living people
South African rugby union players
Stormers players
Western Province (rugby union) players
Rugby union locks
Rugby union flankers
Rugby union players from Johannesburg
Afrikaner people
South Africa Under-20 international rugby union players
South Africa international rugby union players
South African expatriate sportspeople in France
Expatriate rugby union players in France
South African expatriate rugby union players
Stade Toulousain players